The Big Red Spark is the second full-length album by the English progressive rock band Tinyfish.

Track listing 

 "The Loose Ends" – 3:11 (Godfrey/Ramsay)
 "Rainland" – 6:54 (Godfrey/Ramsay/Sanders)
 "A Million Differences" - 2:05 (Godfrey/Ramsay/Sanders)
 "Bad Weather Road" - 6:20 (Godfrey/Ramsay)
 "I'm Not Crashing" - 4:36 (Godfrey)
 "Building The Machine" - 3:16 (Godfrey/Ramsay)
 "Refugee" - 2:24 (Godfrey/Ramsay)
 "The Big Red Spark" - 4:51 (Godfrey/Ramsay/Sanders/Worwood)
 "Weak Machine" - 3:28 (Godfrey)
 "Activation" - 0:38 (Godfrey/Ramsay)
 "The Final Act" - 2:36 (Godfrey/Ramsay/Sanders)
 "The Loose Ends Pt II" - 2:42 (Godfrey/Ramsay)
 "Wide Awake At Midnight" - 10:21 (Godfrey/Ramsay/Sanders/Worwood)

Bonus disc DVD listing 

Initial pressings of The Big Red Spark came with a bonus DVD containing a video interview with the band and the following four additional tracks:

 "The Sarcasm Never Stops" - 5:17 (Godfrey/Ramsay)
 "Ride" - 5:26 (Godfrey/Ramsay)
 "Eat The Ashes" - 3:19 (Godfrey)
 "Let's Get Invisible" - 4:02 (Godfrey/Ramsay)

Personnel
 Simon Godfrey – Vocals, rhythm guitars and drums
 Jim Sanders - Lead and rhythm guitars
 Paul Worwood - Bass guitar
 Robert Ramsay - Voice of the young Professor

with

 Iain Houston - Voice of the Refugee
 Peter Godfrey - Voice of the old Professor
 Jem Godfrey - Mellotron on "Weak Machine"
 Geoff Wootton - Lead vocals on "Ride"
 Mike Varty - Keyboards on "Ride"

and The Big Red Strings

 Zhanna Neckrich - Violin
 Dina Zikeyeva - Violin
 Gocha Skhirlasze - Violin
 Marianna Pulkis - Viola
 Felix Korobov - Cello

Reception
The Big Red Spark was awarded nine out of ten by Geoff Barton in the October edition of Classic Rock.

References

2010 albums
Tinyfish albums